Dominik Popp (born 20 April 1995) is an Austrian footballer who last played for WSG Wattens.

External links
 
 

Austrian footballers
Association football defenders
FC Wacker Innsbruck (2002) players
1995 births
Living people
WSG Tirol players
Austria youth international footballers